Brandon Municipal Airport (also known as Brandon Airport or McGill Field)  is an airport located  north of Brandon, Manitoba, Canada. It serves the City of Brandon, the Westman and Parkland regions of Manitoba, and eastern Saskatchewan. Brandon Municipal Airport is classified as an airport of entry by Nav Canada and is staffed by the Canada Border Services Agency (CBSA) on a call-out basis from the International Peace Garden Border Crossing.

WestJet Encore operates daily non-stop service from Brandon to Calgary International Airport. Brandon Municipal Airport is home to the Commonwealth Air Training Plan Museum.

History

World War II
Brandon Aerodrome was originally built by the Department of National Defense in 1941, for use as a Royal Canadian Air Force flight training school under the British Commonwealth Air Training Plan. Pilots were trained at the airport on Cessna Cranes and Avro Ansons, among other aircraft, for Second World War flying service. In 1945, the school was closed in conjunction with the end of the Second World War.

Portions of the former RCAF Station Brandon are now classified as a National Historic Site of Canada.  The Commonwealth Air Training Plan Museum is a popular tourist attraction located at the airport that commemorates the BCATP and the former Station.

Commercial service
Brandon Municipal Airport has had scheduled passenger air service operated by a number of airlines since the late 1970s. Perimeter Aviation served Brandon Airport in the early 1980s with weekday flights to Winnipeg James Armstrong Richardson International Airport operated with Beechcraft commuter aircraft. Pacific Western Airlines introduced Boeing 737-200 service to Brandon Airport in the mid-1980s, operated on a round trip routing of Vancouver–Kelowna–Calgary–Brandon–Thunder Bay–Toronto six days a week.

During the 1990s, Bearskin Airlines flew Beechcraft Model 99 commuter turboprop aircraft between Brandon Municipal Airport and Winnipeg International Airport with four daily flights, and Perimeter Aviation flew Swearingen Metro commuter propjets with two daily flights between Brandon and Winnipeg. Athabaska Airlines also operated weekday flights to Winnipeg using Beechcraft 1900C commuter prop-jets.

2000s
On September 3, 2013, WestJet Encore launched daily non-stop service from Brandon to Calgary International Airport operated with Bombardier Q400 aircraft. From June 29, 2016 to September 5, 2016, WestJet operated limited-time non-stop service from Brandon to Toronto Pearson International Airport utilizing Boeing 737 aircraft, stating that the service may return dependent on demand and fleet availability. 

A major redevelopment and expansion of the passenger terminal building was announced by local and provincial government officials on August 14, 2014 to meet increased passenger demand. Construction began in 2015, and the new Brandon Municipal Airport terminal building officially opened on May 10, 2017.

Infrastructure

Runways
Runway 14/32 is used for light aircraft only.

Terminal
The Brandon Municipal Airport passenger terminal building is a  facility designed by Prairie Architects Inc. It is a Gold LEED-certified building for its sustainable, green and efficient design, construction and operation.

Construction of the terminal building began in 2015  and was carried out in three phases.
facility, new check-in facilities, and a new baggage claim and carousel. Phase two involved the renovation and redevelopment of the existing terminal building that had been constructed on the site in 1970.  This included the addition of a new Canadian Air Transport Security Authority (CATSA) screening area, a secure side departure lounge, accessible washroom facilities, expanded self-serve retail, new fiber-optic communication infrastructure, and extensive mechanical and energy efficiency improvements. Phase three joined phase one (new terminal) and phase two (redeveloped existing terminal) within a 12 hour timeframe. The airport remained open and fully functional throughout the entire construction process.

The new Brandon Airport terminal building was officially opened to the public on May 10, 2017.

Other facilities
Brandon Flight Centre FBO maintains aircraft hangar facilities at Brandon Municipal Airport and provides aviation fuel, aircraft deicing, and other aviation services 24-hours. Maple Leaf Aviation Ltd provides aircraft maintenance and aviation services and also maintains aircraft hangar facilities at the airport.

Airlines and destinations

Passenger

Ground transportation

Car

Car rental services provided by Enterprise Rent-A-Car are available inside the terminal building.

Taxi
Numerous Brandon taxicab companies provide 24-hour licensed taxi service at Brandon Airport, including wheelchair accessible units.

Shuttle
Brandon Air Shuttle provides shuttle service from Brandon Municipal Airport to Dauphin and other communities in Westman and Parkland regions. Daily shuttle service is available and must be pre-booked.

See also
List of airports in Manitoba

References

External links
Brandon Airport (official City of Brandon website)
Brandon Municipal Airport Virtual Tour
Brandon Airport Information
Brandon Municipal Airport on COPA's Places to Fly airport directory

Certified airports in Manitoba
Airports of the British Commonwealth Air Training Plan
Buildings and structures in Brandon, Manitoba
Transport in Brandon, Manitoba
1941 establishments in Manitoba